Gates of Ishtar is a Swedish melodic death metal band.

History
Gates of Ishtar was formed in late 1992 under the name Disrupt, by Mikael Sandorf (vocals), Andreas Johansson (drums), Stefan Nilsson (guitar) and Harald Åberg (bass). Eventually, the band recruited guitarist Tomas Jutenfäldt. During the band's rehearsal for their demo, Seasons of Frost, Harald coined the band's name "Gates of Ishtar", and Andreas designed the logo.

In May 1995, Seasons of Frost was recorded at Lucichrist studio. This demo led to the group's contract for its first full-length album on the Finnish label Spinefarm Records. In 1996, their debut album, A Bloodred Path was recorded in the Finnish studio Tico-Tico and released by Spinefarm in June. Due to the popular response to this album, and the band's dissatisfaction with Spinefarm Records, Gates of Ishtar switched to the German label Invasion Records. A contract for two full-length albums was signed, and the band started to work on their second album, The Dawn of Flames.

Before work on their second album began, Oskar and Niklas left the band due to personal disagreements with other band members. Henrik Åberg who was their live guitarist was recruited to play the drums. Still missing a bass guitarist, Tomas asked an old friend, Danjel Röhr, to perform as a session musician for The Dawn of Flames. In early 1997, the band travelled to Örebro to record at Unisound studio. On March 25, 1997, the album was released worldwide.

The band reunited in 2015.

On March 3, 2016, drummer Oskar Karlsson died from heart failure.

Although Gates of Ishtar is still listed as active, the band has been on hold since 2019.

On November 15, 2022, the band announced they will play a show in Umeå in 2023.

Discography
 Seasons of Frost (demo) (1995)
 A Bloodred Path (1996)
 The Dawn of Flames (1997)
 At Dusk and Forever (1998)

Band members

Current
 Mikael Sandorf – vocals (1992–1998, 2015–2016, 2022-present), guitars, bass (1997–1998)
 Andreas Johansson – guitars (1994–1997, 2015–2016, 2022-present), drums (1992–1994)
 Tomas Jutenfäldt – guitars (1994–1997, 2015–2016, 2022-present)
 Niklas Svensson – bass (1994–1996, 2015–2016, 2022-present)
 Fredrik Andersson – drums (2022-present)

Former
 Oskar Karlsson – drums (1994–1996, 1997–1998, 2015–2016; died 2016)
 Urban Carlsson – guitars (1997–1998)
 Harald Aberg – bass (1992–1994)
 Stefan Nilsson – guitars (1992–1994)
 Danjel Röhr – bass (1996–1997); died 2022)
 Henrik Åberg – drums (1996–1997)

Timeline

References

Swedish black metal musical groups
Swedish melodic death metal musical groups
Musical groups established in 1992
Musical groups disestablished in 1998